Querqueville is a former commune in the Manche department in north-western France. On 1 January 2016, it was merged into the new commune of Cherbourg-en-Cotentin.

The Chapel of Saint Germanus (Chapelle Saint-Germain) with its trefoil floorplan incorporates elements of one of the earliest surviving places of Christian worship in the Cotentin Peninsula - perhaps second only to the Gallo-Roman baptistry at Port-Bail.

Heraldry

History
During WII, Querqueville Airfield (Advanced Landing Ground) was rebuilt on a former French Navy airfield.

See also
Communes of the Manche department

References

Former communes of Manche
Populated coastal places in France